The McIlwraith Range is a rugged, dissected granite plateau on Cape York Peninsula of Far North Queensland, Australia. The Archer and Stewart Rivers rise in the range, with the Archer draining the range's western slopes into the Gulf of Carpentaria and the Stewart draining east into the Coral Sea.

History 
Kaanju (also known as Kaanju and Kandju) is a language of Cape York. The Kaanju language region includes the landscape within the local government boundaries of the Cook Shire Council.

Environment
The McIlwraith Range has been protected since its gazettal as the Kulla (McIlwraith Range) National Park.  It is also listed on Australia's Register of the National Estate.  It was named after Sir Thomas McIlwraith (1835–1900), three time Premier of Queensland 1879–1883, 1888, and 1893.

The major peaks are Mount Carter, Mount White, Mount Newberry, and Mount Walsh. The range is largely vegetated with a variety of rainforest types, forming the southernmost limit of the ranges of many plants and animals characteristic of New Guinea. These include the spotted cuscus, green tree python and palm cockatoo. An endemic species is the McIlwraith leaf-tailed gecko (Orraya occultus).

Birds
The range is part of the  McIlwraith and Iron Ranges Important Bird Area (IBA), identified as such by BirdLife International because it is one of the few known sites for the endangered buff-breasted buttonquail.  The IBA also supports an isolated population of southern cassowaries as well as populations of lovely fairywrens, silver-crowned friarbirds, yellow, yellow-spotted, white-streaked and banded honeyeaters, and white-browed robins.

References

Further reading

Mountain ranges of Queensland
Landforms of Far North Queensland
Plateaus of Australia
Important Bird Areas of Queensland
2008 establishments in Australia